Mao Zedong 1949 is a 2019 Chinese historical film directed by Huang Jianxin and Ning Haiqiang. The film stars Tang Guoqiang as Mao Zedong, alongside Liu Jing, Huang Jingyu and Wang Likun. The film picks up the history of the leaders of the Central Committee of the Chinese Communist Party, as they prepare to establish the People's Republic at a villa in Beijing's Fragrant Hills in 1949. The film was released in China on September 20, 2019.

Cast
 Tang Guoqiang as Mao Zedong
 Liu Jing as Zhou Enlai
 Huang Jingyu as Chen Youfu
 Wang Likun as Meng Yu
 Qin Lan as Song Qingling
 Du Jiang as Regimental commander
 Ma Tianyu as War correspondent
 Lin Yongjian as Nie Rongzhen
 Zhang Hanyu as Mao Renfeng
 Ma Xiaowei as Chiang Kaishek
 Pu Cunxin as Li Zongren
 Liu Zhibing as Zhang Zhizhong
 Gao Shuguang as Bai Chongxi
 Wang Wufu as Zhu De
 Liu Sha as Liu Shaoqi
 Wang Jian as Ren Bishi
 Zhang Zijian as Li Kenong
 Lü Xing as Chiang Chingkuo
 Audrey Duo as Li Ne
 Zhou Tao as Song Meiling
 Nie Yuan as Luo Ruiqing
 Wu Haochen as Mao Anying
 Wu Gang as 
 Hu Wenge as Mei Lanfang
 Zhao Yi as Lin Biao
 Zhang Jianya as Li Zheng
 Ma Lun as Zhang Shizhao
 Li Shilong as 
 Cheng Zhiping as Cheng Siyuan
 Huang Wei as Deng Yingchao
 Zhao Ningyu as Ye Fei
 Gao Ge as 
 Shi Xin as Deng Xiaoping
 Ye Jin as Ye Jianying
 Gao Zheng as Tian Jiaying
 Yuan Zhongxian as Huang Shaohong
 Cheng Guodong as Liu Fei

Production
Huang Jianxin (The Founding of a Republic and The Founding of a Party) was hired as director.

The film was shot on a tight schedule of 67 days.

Release
Mao Zedong 1949 was slated for release on September 12, 2019, in China but was postponed to September 20, 2019. The film premiered at the Shanghai International Film Festival on June 19, 2019, and opened in China on September 20, 2019.

Reception
Douban, a major Chinese media rating site, gave the drama 6.9 out of 10.

Box office
The film grossed in over 4 million yuan (565,531 U.S. dollars) at the Chinese box office on its opening weekend, according to statistics released by Maoyan, a Chinese film database and ticketing platform.

References

External links
 

2019 films
Chinese historical films
Films shot in Beijing
Films set in 1949
Films set in Beijing
Cultural depictions of Mao Zedong
Cultural depictions of Zhou Enlai
Cultural depictions of Zhu De
Cultural depictions of Liu Shaoqi
Cultural depictions of Deng Xiaoping
Cultural depictions of Peng Dehuai
Cultural depictions of Chiang Kai-shek
2010s Mandarin-language films